Mohammadpur Government High School (also known as MGHS) is one of the oldest public schools located in Dhaka, Bangladesh. The institution offers primary and secondary education for boys.

History
The school was established in 1967 and follows the National Curriculum and Textbook Board in the medium of Bengali.

Structure
The school enrolls students from Class 1 to 10. The school operates in two shifts: Morning and Day. Students of Class 1 to 10 can read in the Morning shift. But in Day shift, it is only for Class 6 to 10. There is an additional non governmental section in the school for class 1 to 5. The students pass from the additional shift, can directly admit in the Day shift. Every year about approximately 500 students appear in the PEC, JSC & SSC examination, with about half in Science, and half in Business Studies.

Admission
Under the control of Directorate General of Secondary and Higher Education, Dhaka admission lotteries of all the government schools of Dhaka city are taken. There is no intense competition in the admission process. Students are selected to study at this school by lottery. Usually students are admitted in classes 1,6 and 9. Admission can be considered in other classes if a vacancy is created. The admission test is taken usually in December after the annual exam.

Guardian teacher conference
To make each students best from better, a conference is called where they discuss the problems of a student and how to remove those. Thus this school gradually makes good results in PEC, JSC & SSC.

School magazine
The name of the magazine of the school is UDDIPON (উদ্দীপন). The magazine is not published regularly every year. It is published after every 4 years. The school magazine is a historical document of the growth of the school. It informs the future generation of students about the traditions built up of their school. This valuable publication is the opportunity that students require to show their creative talents. Along with academic studies, students are encouraged in games and athletics, art and craft, science clubs, dramatics and various other activities. These make the years in school interesting and worth remembering. But intellectual activities like debates, elocution and essay-writing competitions are rarely found. The school magazine is the window to the activities of the school. Proper initiative by the teachers can help in improving the views and expressions of the students which in turn will raise the standard of the magazine.

Extracurricular activities

Sports: The students of MGHS are active in sports. The annual sports competition is organized by the school authority in February each year. Sprints (100 to 400 meters), long jump, and high jump are few to mention among different kinds of sports in which students participate. The students of MGHS take part in Inter-School Cricket, Football, Kabaddi, and Rugby Tournaments.
Cultural Program: A 'Cultural Program' is observed every year in the school. In which, students can explore the talents inside them.
Debate: The students of MGHS takes part in different debate competitions.
Math Olympiad: The students of the school takes part in National Mathematics Olympiad.
Science Fair: The science loving students of MGHS takes part in different science fairs and other science-based tournaments.
National Programs: The students in-general as well as the Scouts, the Red Crescents and the Cadets take part in different national programs.

Clubs
Mohammadpur Government High School Scouts Group
Bangladesh Red Crescent Society
Bangladesh National Cadet Corps (BNCC)
MGHS Band Team
MGHS Science Club
MGHS Debating Club

List of headmasters

M. Imran Ali (February 14, 1967 to May 25, 1968)
Shams Uddin Ahmed (June 22, 1968 to December 31, 1977)
Amir Ali (December 31, 1977 to February 28, 1978)
Md. Motiur Rahman (March 20, 1978 to February 12, 1984)
Begum Hamida Khatun (February 12, 1984 to July 31, 1988)
Shirajul Islam (August 1, 1988 to September 29, 1989)
Md. Johirul Haque (September 30, 1989 to April 29, 1991)
Md. Sikandar Ali Khalifa (May 26, 1991 to October 12, 1995)
Muhammad Shahidur Rahman (October 12, 1995 to October 28, 1999)
A.K.M. Mustafa Kamal (November 2, 1999 to June 26, 2002)
Rehana Khanom (June 27, 2002 to October 8, 2007)
Md. Bengir Ahmed (October 8, 2007 to November 22, 2014)
Azhar Uddin Ahmed (November 25, 2014 - September, 2015)
Abul Kalam Mustafa (September, 2015 - August, 2017)
Nurun Nahar (August, 2017– October 2021)
Gouro Chandra Mandal (October, 2021 - Present)

Notable alumni
General Aziz Ahmed, Chief of Army Staff of the Bangladesh Army

See also
High schools in Bangladesh
Education in Bangladesh

References

External links
Official website

High schools in Bangladesh
Educational institutions established in 1967
1967 establishments in East Pakistan